Coipapite (possibly from Quechua qullpa saltpeter, p'iti dividing by pulling powerfully to the extremes; gap, interruption) is a mountain in the Andes of Peru which reaches an altitude of approximately . It is located in the Junín Region, Yauli Province, Marcapomacocha District, and in the Lima Region Canta Province, Huaros District. It lies at the Quri Wayi valley, southeast of a lake named Marcapomacocha.

Culpa Piti is also the name of an unpopulated place in the Quri Wayi valley northeast of the mountain.

References

Mountains of Peru
Mountains of Junín Region
Mountains of Lima Region